Acanthothecis oryzoides is a species of corticolous (bark-dwelling) lichen in the family Graphidaceae. Found in Brazil, it was formally described as a new species in 2022 by André Aptroot, Robert Lücking, and Marcela Eugenia da Silva Cáceres. The lichen has a dull, glaucous-white thallus, lacking a prothallus. The ascospores are hyaline, ellipsoid, and measure 69–80 by 25–35 μm; they have from 9 to 13 transverse septa with light constrictions at the septa.

References

oryzoides
Lichen species
Lichens described in 2022
Lichens of North Brazil
Taxa named by André Aptroot
Taxa named by Robert Lücking
Taxa named by Marcela Cáceres